Lake Las Vegas in Henderson, Nevada, refers to a  reservoir and the  developed area around the reservoir.  The area is sometimes referred to as the Lake Las Vegas Resort. It is being developed by 5 companies including Lake at Las Vegas Joint Venture LLC.

The area includes three resorts including the Aston MonteLago Village Resort, the Westin Lake Las Vegas Resort, and the Hilton Lake Las Vegas.

Overview 
It contains roughly the same amount of dirt as Hoover Dam does concrete, and impounds  of water. Since the reservoir was built in the channel of the Las Vegas Wash — the valley's only storm runoff outlet — A bypass was built for the wash beneath the reservoir and dam allowing it to remain connected to Lake Mead via two  diameter pipes. The bypass is a flood control measure, allowing flood waters to be diverted under the reservoir into Lake Mead with the rest absorbed by Lake Las Vegas itself. After falling into substantial disrepair, the pipes — which are owned by the city of Henderson, but maintained by the resort — were repaired in 2009 at a cost of $3 million.

History 
Actor J. Carlton Adair conceived Lake Las Vegas around 1967 as Lake Adair. At the time he purchased the land and water rights. In 1987, Ronald Boeddeker acquired  from the US Government when Adair went bankrupt. The property was acquired by Transcontinental Properties in 1990. In 1995, Henry Gluck, the former chairman and chief executive officer of Caesars World, became the co-Chairman of Transcontinental Properties. With Sid Bass and Lee Bass, two billionaires from Fort Worth, Texas, he developed the new community. The project cost US $5 billion.

Lake at Las Vegas Joint Venture, LLC filed for Chapter 11 bankruptcy on July 17, 2008. Debts were estimated at between $500 million and $1 billion.  Lake Las Vegas emerged from bankruptcy in July 2010 with a plan that took nearly two years to complete.  All existing debt was wiped away and the development has $30 million in hand to complete several of the unfinished infrastructure projects.  The Lake Las Vegas bankruptcy creditors, not Lake Las Vegas development themselves, have filed a lawsuit against the former insiders (Bass Brothers, TransContinental, etc.). The creditors' theory is that the $500 million equity loan the former insiders took against the property caused the demise of Lake Las Vegas.  The creditors are hoping to recoup money from the former insiders.  In a related action, resort property owners are suing lender Credit Suisse as part of a multibillion-dollar lawsuit led by bankrupt Yellowstone Club founder Timothy Blixseth and his son Beau Blixseth who claim the Lake Las Vegas Joint Venture bankruptcy was caused by a "loan to own" scheme between the bank and resort developers.  The golf course was purchased by Nevada South Shore LLC, a Hawaii-based corporation for $4.5 million on February 17, 2011.  The Ritz Carlton, Lake Las Vegas, closed after 8 years of operation on  May 2, 2010.  The Ritz Carlton was then reopened by international boutique hotelier Dolce Hotels on February 11, 2011, as the Ravella at Lake Las Vegas. On April 30, 2013, Kam Sang Co. announced that the Ravella would be renamed the Hilton Lake Las Vegas, the name under which the hotel continues to operate. The Hilton opened June 6, 2013.

Lake Las Vegas was the subject of a lawsuit between investment fund Claymore Holdings and Credit Suisse, which was the agent for a syndicate of entities that loaned $540 million to develop the property. Claymore and others accused Credit Suisse of fraudulently inflating the value of the development in order to generate higher fees for itself. The core of the allegations centered on a new appraisal methodology conceived of by Credit Suisse executive David Miller, who in internal emails is referred to as Credit Suisse's Dr. Frankenstein. In 2015, a Texas judge ordered Credit Suisse to pay $288 million to Highland, Claymore and others.  The verdict was partially offset by other payments to Highland, meaning that Claymore received most of the Credit Suisse judgment.  That Judgment was reversed by the Texas Supreme Court in April 2020, and Claymore's Judgment was reduced to $26 million (plus interest).

Casino MonteLago/Lake Las Vegas Event Center

Casino MonteLago was opened on May 8, 2003, having been built by Cook Inlet Region, Inc., an Alaska Native shareholder owned corporation. The casino closed for the first time on March 14, 2010, due to the Great Recession; but on May 26, 2011, after renovation, the casino re-opened to the public. In November 2012, the casino was acquired along with the Ravella at Lake Las Vegas for a total of $47 million by Kam Sang Co., a California-based real estate developer. The casino closed for the second time on October 29, 2013, as a result of a lease dispute between Kam Sang and the casino's operators. In the beginning of 2016, the facility reopened as the Lake Las Vegas Event Center, hosting special events, exhibits and entertainment. It is attached to the Hilton Lake Las Vegas and accessible from MonteLago Village.

Notes

References

External links
Lake Las Vegas
Lake Las Vegas Blog

Las Vegas
Las Vegas
Tourist attractions in the Las Vegas Valley
Planned communities in Clark County, Nevada
Triathlon venues
1990 establishments in Nevada